Fun Bits Interactive, LLC was an American video game developer based in Seattle. It was founded in 2010 by the core team formerly of Titan Studios. In 2010, three of the team members from Fat Princess of Titan Studios started Atomic Operations, which was then renamed as Fun Bits Interactive. After Titan completed Fat Princess, Fun Bits continued work on the project releasing the Fat Roles DLC, which supported additional classes, private servers and clan support.

Games developed 

Fat Princess Adventures is an action role based video game for the PlayStation 4 platform. It was released 2015 via Sony Computer Entertainment and is a continuation from the original Fat Princess: Fat Roles DLC game.

Squids from Space is a top-down, team-based, multiplayer, action shooter game between humans and Squid aliens from space, initially set in the 1950s Everything is Different After the Eclipse. The game initially released with one map and one game mode. It had its first public beta testing for its second map, The Moonbase, on 31 July 2017. The core gameplay mechanics involves two teams of eight players with the main objective of capturing the enemy leader three times. Meanwhile, the teams can gain an advantage by collecting resources found throughout the map and bringing them back to their bases in order to unlock stronger weapons.

References

External links

Companies based in Seattle
Video game companies established in 2010
Defunct video game companies of the United States
Video game development companies
2010 establishments in Washington (state)